Side or Sides may refer to:

Geometry
 Edge (geometry) of a polygon (two-dimensional shape)
 Face (geometry) of a polyhedron (three-dimensional shape)

Places
 Side, Turkey, a city in Turkey
 Side (Ainis), a town of Ainis, ancient Thessaly, Greece
 Side (Caria), a town of ancient Caria, Anatolia
 Side (Laconia), a town of ancient Laconia, Greece
 Side (Pontus), a town of ancient Pontus, Anatolia
 Side, Iran, a village in Iran
 Side, Gloucestershire, or Syde, a village in England

Music
 Side (recording), the A-side or B-side of a record
 The Side, a Scottish rock band
 Sides (album), a 1979 album by Anthony Phillips
 Sides, a 2020 album by Emily King
 "Side" (song), a 2001 song by Travis
 "Sides", a song by Flobots from the album The Circle in the Square, 2012
 "Sides", a song by Allday from the album Speeding, 2017

Teams
 Side (cue sports technique)
 Side, a team, in particular:
 Sports team

Other uses
 Side (gay sex), a sex role
 Side (mythology), in Greek mythology
 Side, a Morris dance team
 Sideboard (cards), known as a "side" in some collectible card games
 Sides (surname), a surname
 Side dish, a food item accompanying a main course
 School of Isolated and Distance Education, a public school in Perth, Western Australia
 Secretariat of Intelligence, an Argentinian intelligence agency
 Social identity model of deindividuation effects, in social psychology

See also
 
 
 Relative direction, left and right
 Syde
 Cide (disambiguation)
 Sidle (disambiguation)